Experience Preferred.... But Not Essential is a 1982 British TV film directed by Peter Duffell as part of the First Love series. It is set in a Welsh hotel in 1962 where Annie, a student, arrives to spend the summer as a waitress.

Production
Like the other First Love films, Experience preferred.... was shot "in about twenty days for well under £0.5m" though the overall budget was £505,000. Goldcrest Films invested £480,000 in it and received £728,000 earning them a profit of £248,000.

Cast 
 Elizabeth Edmonds (actress) as Annie
 Sue Wallace as Mavis
 Geraldine Griffiths as Doreen
 Karen Meagher as Paula
 Maggie Wilkinson as Arlene
 Ron Bain as Mike
 Alun Lewis as Hywel
 Robert Blythe as Ivan
 Roy Heather as Wally
 Peter Doran as Dai
 Arwen Holm as Helen
 Sion Tudor Owen as Nin
 Robert Gwilym as Gareth
 Mostyn Evans as Now
 Paul Haley as Mr. Howard
 Margo Jenkins as Mrs. Howard
 Jerry Brooke as Gaiety M. C.

Reception
Variety said “generally the picture looks a treat”. Screen International said that UA Classics had great success with Experience Preferred.... But Not Essential in contrast to P'Tang Yang Kipperbang. In 1984, Gavin Millar said in Sight & Sound that it "had them queueing round the block in New York". Looking back in 1987, David Rose (interviewed by Nicolas Kent) in Sight & Sound described it as “one of Channel 4’s first big successes in America”.

References

External links

1982 television films
1982 films
Films directed by Peter Duffell